Ann is a town in Rakhine State, Myanmar (Burma). It has a population of 119,714 and is served by Ann Airport. It is center of general headquarter of the Myanmar Army's Western Command.

History 
The Town was founded by King Min Hti around early 14th century.

References

External links
 19° 47' 0" North, 94° 2' 0" East Satellite map at Maplandia.com

Township capitals of Myanmar
Populated places in Kyaukpyu District
Ann Township